Santi Pracha Dhamma Library is the social science and spiritual library. It was created in 2003, making for the memorial place for the late Puey Ungpakorn, the statesman of Thailand, who had died in 2000. 
It was founded by Sulak Sivaraksa, a renowned Thai social activist and social critic.

The library aims to be a place for spiritual searching, intellectual property resource, available for social activists and all people.

It is located in Khlong San District, Charoen Nakhon Road, Bangkok.

External links
 Facebook Page
 " A seminar on “the Role of Dhammakaya in a Thai Society”

2003 establishments in Thailand
Libraries in Thailand
Libraries established in 2003